Mohamad Nasir (born June 27, 1960, in Ngawi Regency, Indonesia) is an Indonesian politician and professor. He was the Minister of Research, Technology, and Higher Education of the Republic of Indonesia in the Working Cabinet (2014–2019). He was appointed by President Joko Widodo on October 27, 2014, replacing Gusti Muhammad Hatta. He was rector-elect of Diponegoro University in Indonesia and was supposed to be sworn in on December 18, 2014.

Early life and education 
Mohamad Nasir was born in Ngawi, East Java. He was raised in Rembang, Central Java where he lived with his parents. Nasir schooled at Pondok Pesantren Al-Islah. He then studied economics at the Diponegoro University, where he obtained a BSc in economics (1983–1988). In 1993 he obtained a Master of Science from Gadjah Mada University. He also has a PhD in accounting from the Universiti Sains Malaysia (USM).

Career 
Nasir began his career as a professor at the Diponegoro University, where he was also dean of the Masters of Accounting Program in the Faculty of Economics. He was appointed vice rector of the Diponegoro University between 2006 and 2010. In 2010, he was appointed dean in the Faculty of Economics and Business. In early 2014 after serving as dean for four years, he was appointed rector of Diponegoro University and was said to sworn in officially on December 18, 2014.

On October 27, 2014, he was appointed minister by President Joko Widodo several weeks before his official swearing in as rector of Diponegoro University. He was assigned to the portfolio of Minister of Research, Technology, and Higher Education.

Controversy 
Nasir Muhammad at the beginning of 2016 had issued a controversial statement against the lesbian, gay, bisexual, and transgender (LGBT). He questioned the existence of counseling support organization and resource center on Sexuality Studies at the University of Indonesia, the group was said to be an organization rather than a group of students LGBT support group for LGBT and reviewing studies of gender and sexual orientation diversity. Nasir had issued a statement banning LGBT on campus. However, the debate spread to the existence of LGBT people in Indonesia itself to their judgment, and the prohibition of expulsion, violence, intimidation and protests against the LGBT.

References 

Living people
1960 births
People from Ngawi Regency
Diponegoro University alumni
Gadjah Mada University alumni
Government ministers of Indonesia
Working Cabinet (Joko Widodo)